35 MPH Town (as known as 35 mph TOWN) is the eighteenth studio album by American country music artist Toby Keith. It was released on October 9, 2015 by Show Dog-Universal Music.

Commercial performance
35 MPH Town debuted on the Billboard 200 at No. 14 and Top Country Albums at No. 2, with 19,000 copies sold in its first week. The album sold a further 6,700 copies in the US in the second week.

Track listing

Personnel

Vocals
Lead vocals – Toby Keith
Background vocals – Greg Barnhill, Scotty Emerick, Paige Logan, Mac McAnally, Mica Roberts
Featured vocals – Jimmy Buffett on "Sailboat For Sale"

Instruments

Accordion – John Deaderick, Jim Hoke
Acoustic guitar – Scotty Emerick, Kenny Greenberg, Mac McAnally, Danny Rader, Rivers Rutherford, Bobby Terry, Ilya Toshinsky
Banjo – Danny Rader
Bass guitar – Kevin "Swine" Grantt, Rachel Loy, Jim Mayer, Michael Rhodes
Cello – Anthony LaMarchina, Emily Nelson 
Drums – Chad Cromwell, Fred Eltringham, Roger Guth 
Electric guitar – Kenny Greenberg, Brent Mason, Adam Shoenfeld 
Fiddle – Eamon McLoughlin
Hammond B-3 organ – Tim Lauer
Mandolin – Aubrey Haynie, Danny Rader, Ilya Toshinsky
Pedal steel guitar – Doyle Grisham, Russ Pahl
Percussion – Eric Darken, Kenny Greenberg, Mills Logan
Piano – John Deaderick, Charlie Judge, Tim Lauer
Saxophone – Roman Dudok
Steel drums – Robert Greenidge
Synthesizer – Charlie Judge
Trombone – Carl Murr
Trumpet – Jay Jennings
Vibraphone – Eric Darken
Viola – Elizabeth Lamb, Jim Larson
Violin – Carolyn Bailey, David Davidson, Charles Dixon, Adrienne Harmon
Wurlitzer – Tim Lauer, Steve Nathan

Production

Assistant – Jarad Clement, Alex Jarvis, Ernesto Olvera, Lowell Reynolds, Robby Schneider, Nick Spezia, Mike Stankiewicz, Misha Williams Tristan
Assistant Engineer – Nick Spezia
Conductor – Charlie Judge
Editing – Brady Barnett, Jed Hackett, Alex Jarvis
Engineering – Mills Logan
Mastering – Ken Love
Mixing – Mills Logan
Production – Mac McAnally, Bobby Pinson, Toby Keith
Production Coordination – Bud Fox

Imagery
Art direction – Susannah Parrish
Creative Director – Natalie Moore
Design – Susannah Parrish 
Photography – Greg Watermann

Chart performance

Weekly charts

Year-end charts

References

2015 albums
Show Dog-Universal Music albums
Toby Keith albums
Albums produced by Toby Keith